The following is a list of the 19 former cantons of the French Guiana department, an overseas department of France, sorted by arrondissement. The cantons were abolished in 2015, when the Assembly of French Guiana replaced the General Council of French Guiana and the Regional Council of French Guiana.

Arrondissement of Cayenne (16 cantons) 
 Approuague-Kaw
 Cayenne 1st Canton Nord-Ouest
 Cayenne 2nd Canton Nord-Est
 Cayenne 3rd Canton Sud-Ouest
 Cayenne 4th Canton Centre
 Cayenne 5th Canton Sud
 Cayenne 6th Canton Sud-Est
 Iracoubo
 Kourou
 Macouria
 Matoury
 Montsinéry-Tonnegrande
Rémiré-Montjoly
 Roura
 Saint-Georges-de-l'Oyapock
 Sinnamary

Arrondissement of Saint-Laurent-du-Maroni (3 cantons) 
 Mana
 Maripasoula
 Saint-Laurent-du-Maroni

References

 
Geography of French Guiana
French Guiana 2